Dil  is a 2003 Indian Telugu-language action comedy film directed by V. V. Vinayak and produced by debutant Raju. The film stars Nithiin, Neha, and Prakash Raj. The film is commercially successful at the box office. The success of the film led to the producer Raju becoming known as Dil Raju henceforth.

The film is remade in Oriya as Premi No.1 (2004), in Kannada as Student, in Tamil as Kuththu (2004), in Indian Bengali as Challenge (2009), and in Bangladeshi Bengali as Bhalobasha Zindabad (2013).

Plot 
Seenu (Nithiin) is a new admit at Maharaja College of Arts and Sciences. Nandini (Neha) goes to the same college. Seenu is from a middle-class family, while Nandini is the only daughter of Gowri Shankar (Prakash Raj), a land mafia don. Gowri's assistant suspects them to be lovers after he finds them dancing at the fresher's celebration at college. Seenu gets beaten up badly. Irritated by this, Seenu is challenged to win Nandini's love. After a few attempts, she falls in love with him. They elope and get married when Gowri tries to separate them. The story takes a few turns before it ends in a happy note.

Cast 

 Nithiin as Sreenivas aka Seenu
 Neha as Nandini
 Prakash Raj as Gowri Shankar
 Chalapati Rao as Seenu's father
 Sudha as Seenu's mother
 Kalpana as Nandini's mother
 MS Narayana as Principal
 L. B. Sriram as Ramanatham
 Duvvasi Mohan as Villager
 Venu Madhav as Venu, Seenu’s uncle
 Sangeetha as Nandini's grandmother
 Raghu Babu as Gowri's assistant 
 Raghu Karumanchi
 Rajan P. Dev as Nandini's grandfather 
 Rallapalli as Telephone Exchange Employee
 Ahuti Prasad as police officer

Production
This was the first film as the producer for "Dil" Raju. In fact, his name got prefixed with the title as it brought him recognition in the film industry. After this, he went on to register many hits, and the credit  displayed on the screens of his movies is still "Dil" Raju. This was the debut for the heroine Neha.

Soundtrack
The music was composed by R. P. Patnaik and released by Aditya Music.

Reception 
Jeevi of idlebrain.com wrote that "Over all, it's a good film to watch".

Remakes 
Dil was remade into Oriya as Premi No.1 in 2004. It was remade into Kannada as Student. The film is also remade in Tamil in 2004 as Kuththu. The film was also dubbed in Hindi as Bichhoo: The Scorpion in 2010. The movie was also remade in Bengali in 2009 as Challenge and in Dhallywood Bangladesh in 2013 as Bhalobasha Zindabad.

References

External links 
 

2000s Telugu-language films
2003 films
Telugu films remade in other languages
Indian romantic comedy-drama films
2000s action comedy-drama films
2003 romantic comedy-drama films
Films set in Hyderabad, India
Films shot in Hyderabad, India
Films directed by V. V. Vinayak
2000s masala films
Indian action comedy-drama films
2003 comedy films
Sri Venkateswara Creations films